Allan Curtis Barnes (September 27, 1949 – July 25, 2016) was an American jazz musician, based in Detroit for the majority of his career.

Early life
Barnes was born in Detroit, Michigan, on September 21, 1949. He received his first musical training from his musician uncles, Joe and Robert Barnes. In 1967, Barnes enlisted in the United States Army and trained at the Army Element of the U.S. Naval School of Music. After a year in the 437th, he was deployed to South Vietnam and the 4th Division Army Band.

Musical career

After being discharged, Barnes played his way back to Detroit. He was discovered by trumpeter Donald Byrd who insisted that Barnes come to Howard University and play with a new band he was putting together, the Blackbyrds. Barnes traveled the world with Donald Byrd and the Blackbyrds. The band's first album went gold with Barnes writing two of the songs: "Summer Love" and "The Blackbyrds Theme". The band's second album, Flying Start, contained the hit single "Walking in Rhythm", with Barnes being featured on flute.

Barnes formed his own band, Allan Barnes and Primetime. He played and recorded with numerous artists, including Gil Scott-Heron, Lyman Woodard David II, Fred Wesley, Nina Simone, Lee Oscar, Pini Cohen, Bennie Maupin, Siggy Dillard, Delbert Taylor, Robert Guillaume, Wilson Pickett, Christian DiMaggio, Lakeside, Ceri Lucas, Prince, the Mizell Brothers, Marcus Belgrave, Harold McKinney, Bootsy Collins, the Detroit Experiment, Regina Carter, Geri Allen, the Dramatics, the Interzone Orchestra, Reggie Braxton, Sandy Patton, Dwight Adams, Sunny Wilkinson, Sunny Girl, Martha Reeves, Mary Wilson, Teddy Harris, Roy Brooks, Big John Patton, Milt Hinton, Grant Green, Pharoah Sanders, Sonny Rollins and Billy Taylor.

During his career Barnes wrote music with John Malone and had a single, “Disco Dancin'”, on the first Taste of Honey album and with R. Kelly co-wrote the single “Money Makes the World Go Round”. He has written music for commercials with Larry King, Brenda Sykes, Sugar Ray Leonard, Leslie Nielsen, and Muhammad Ali. He penned the music for the PBS movie One Night's Run and the PBS series Small Business Magazine. In addition he wrote station identification theme for the University of Michigan public television station. Barnes created and hosted the PBS show Jazzland. He also had a cameo in the Clint Eastwood film Bird (1988).

Later projects
Barnes wrote “Until We Meet Again”, a classic jazz piece. He was seen in the feature role in the PBS special American Jazz Greats: Evolution of the Jazz Saxophone. Barnes led the band Giant Steps, which consists of six band leaders: Cliff Monear, Marion Hayden, Rayse Biggs, Sunny Wilkinson, and Gayelynn McKinney. His sound was described as "calling out to the audience and inviting them in with his masterful improvisation, supreme musicianship and his significant contributions to the preservation of the history of jazz".

Barnes was employed by several modern Detroit artists in the Detroit hip-hop scene including Finale, Big Tone, and Stryfe, for all of whom he performed in the studio. Barnes was a frequent collaborator of the Detroit hip-hop/funk fusion band Gorilla Funk Mob, from 2007. Barnes is featured on Rebirth of Detroit (2012), along with a wide array of Detroit hip-hop artists, all performing over beats from legendary producer J Dilla.

Death
Barnes died on July 25, 2016, in Detroit after suffering a heart attack.

Discography

References

External links
 American Jazz Greats

1949 births
2016 deaths
American jazz saxophonists
American male saxophonists
United States Army personnel of the Vietnam War
African-American jazz musicians
Musicians from Detroit
United States Army soldiers
Jazz musicians from Michigan
American male jazz musicians
The Blackbyrds members
20th-century African-American musicians
21st-century African-American musicians
20th-century American saxophonists
21st-century American saxophonists